The Communist Party of the Philippines is a far-left, Marxist-Leninist-Maoist revolutionary organization and communist party in the Philippines, formed by Jose Maria Sison  on 26 December 1968. It is designated as a terrorist group by the United States Department of State together with Sison and its armed wing New People's Army (NPA) in 2002. The European Union renewed its terrorist designation on the organization in 2019, though a 2009 ruling by the EU's second highest court delisted Sison as a "person supporting terrorism" and reversed a decision by member governments to freeze assets. According to the US' Central Intelligence Agency (CIA) World Factbook, the CPP and the NPA aims to destabilize the Philippines' economy and  overthrow the national government.

Philippine president and Sison's former student Rodrigo Duterte declared the group a terrorist organization in 2017, though the CPP-NPA has not yet been legally declared as a terrorist group by Philippine courts.

The CPP has been fighting a guerrilla war against the state since its establishment. Although its ranks initially numbered around 500, the party grew quickly, supposedly due to the declaration and imposition of martial law by former president and dictator Ferdinand Marcos during his 21-year rule. By the end of Marcos rule in the country, the number of combatants had expanded to include more than 10,000 fighters. In a speech before the US Congress in 1986, President Corazon Aquino accredited the party's rapid growth as being caused by Marcos' attempts to stifle it with the "means by which it grows" with his establishment of martial law, suggesting that other governments view it as a lesson when dealing with communist insurgencies.

In 2019, Sison claimed that the number of its members and supporters is growing, despite claims by the Philippine government that the organization is close to being destroyed. The organization remains an underground operation, with its primary goals being to overthrow the Philippine government through armed revolution and remove U.S. influence over the Philippines. It consists of the National Democratic Front, a coalition of other revolutionary organizations in the Philippines with aligning goals; the Kabataang Makabayan, which serves as its youth wing; and the New People's Army, which serves as its armed wing.

At present, the CPP is the largest Marxist, Leninist, and Maoist revolutionary formation in the world, having some 150,000 members, as claimed by its cadres and officials.

History

The Communist Party of the Philippines (CPP) was reestablished on 26 December 1968, coinciding with the 75th birthday of Mao Zedong, the Chairman of the Chinese Communist Party.

Amado Guerrero, then a central committee member of Partido Komunista ng Pilipinas or PKP-1930, led the reestablishment of the party. Jose Maria Sison, allegedly the man behind the nom de guerre Amado Guerrero, confirmed its birth at Barangay Dulacac in the tri-boundary of Alaminos, Bani and Mabini in the province of Pangasinan.  This is where the CPP's "Congress of Reestablishment" was held on 26 December 1968, at a hut near the house of the Navarettes, the parents-in-law of Arthur Garcia, one of the CPP founders.

Jose Maria Sison is the central figure behind the CPP and its formation. According to Party documents, in the 1960s, a massive leftist unrest called First Quarter Storm occurred in the country to protest against the government policies, graft and corruption and decline of the economy during the presidency of Ferdinand Marcos. The unrest was also inspired by the Great Proletarian Cultural Revolution, the Vietnam War and other revolutionary struggles abroad against the United States. One of the leaders of this leftist movement was Jose Maria Sison, a founder of Kabataang Makabayan. He was soon recruited to be a member of Partido Komunista ng Pilipinas (PKP-1930). During that time the new PKP members, independently from the incumbent PKP members, were conducting clandestine theoretical and political education on Marxism–Leninism, with special attention dedicated to workers, peasants and youth. This would eventually lead to a significant split between the PKP members. The new members advocated to resume what they regarded as the unfinished armed revolution against foreign and feudal domination, referring to what was claimed to be legacy and de facto continuation of the Philippine–American War of 1899, combat subjectivism and opportunism in the history of the old merger party and fight modern revisionism then being promoted by the Soviet Union. This ideology was the basis for the split from the PKP-1930, the (re)creation of the CPP, and the subsequent "Congress of Reestablishment."

Reestablishment Congress
Irreconcilable differences occurred between the new party members with the leadership of the PKP under Jose Lava. Sison, was tasked by PKP to conduct a review of the party history of the old merger party.

However, on his report, leaders of the PKP headed by Jesus Lava disagreed with Sison's findings that criticized the major errors of the PKP which caused the almost total destruction of the revolutionary movement in the 1950s. A sharp division and struggle developed between them in ideological and political issues, Sison and his group led the reestablishment of the party after he and his colleagues bolted out from the PKP.  Jesus Lava, the General Secretary of the PKP, was labelled a "counterrevolutionary revisionist", and the new leaders also attacked what they called "the gangster clique" of Pedro Taruc-Sumulong in the old people's army of the Hukbong Mapagpalaya ng Bayan (HMB), remnant of the Hukbalahap in Central Luzon.

The Party issued the document of rectification, "Rectify Errors and Rebuild the Party," and promulgated the Programme for a People's Democratic Revolution and the new Party Constitution in its Congress of Reestablishment. The two communist parties deviation was clear ideologically when the Lava's PKP was supporting the Communist Party of the Soviet Union whom Sison's group considered revisionist while the latter supported the line of the Communist Party of China.

The reestablishment was centered on a comprehensive and thoroughgoing criticism and repudiation of modern revisionism and of the leadership of the Lavas in Manila as well as the Taruc-Sumulong grouping which had usurped authority over remnants of the HMB.

The party congress was attended by 12 members, namely Jose Maria Sison, Monico Atienza, Rey Casipe, Leoncio Co, Manuel Collantes, Arthur Garcia, Herminihildo Garcia, Ruben Guevara, Art Pangilinan, Nilo Tayag, Fernando Tayag at Ibarra Tubianosa. Jose Luneta was counted as the 13th member. He was elected in the Central Committee in absentia, since he was still in China.

People's war

Soon after its reestablishment, the Party linked up with the other cadres and commanders of the HMB and engaged them in ideological and political studies, mass work and politico-military training. On 29 March 1969, the New People's Army was established and on 24 April 1973 the National Democratic Front (Philippines).

Afterwards, the CPP launched the "protracted people's war" a strategical line developed by Mao Zedong during the phase of guerrilla warfare of the Chinese Communist Party. The eventual objective is to install a "people's revolutionary government" via a two-stages revolution: National Democratic Revolution followed by a Socialist Revolution.

The reestablishment was considered by the party as the First Great Rectification Movement, criticizing the errors of the old Party. The CPP adheres to Marxism-Leninism-Maoism as its guiding ideology in analyzing and summing up the experience of the party and its creative application to the concrete conditions in the Philippines in fighting US imperialism, feudalism and bureaucrat capitalism. It considers Maoism as the highest development of Marxism-Leninism.

It considers the Philippine society as semicolonial and semifeudal, the character of the present revolution as national democratic of the new type (led by the proletariat), the motive forces, the targets, the strategy and tactics and the socialist perspective of the Philippine revolution.

Despite the arrests of CPP Central Committee members in 1973, 1974, 1976 and 1977, the erstwhile skeletal regional Party organizations gained flesh and muscle from the growth of the armed revolutionary movement and the urban underground.

Second Great Rectification Movement

In the 10th plenum of the CPP, the party engaged in a "second rectification movement" that reviewed and corrected the errors that created havoc on the revolutionary movement for more than a decade since its founding in 1968.

Armando Liwanag, chairman of CPP, issued a document called "Reaffirm Our Basic Principles and Carry the Revolution Forward" that repudiated the deviations of leading party cadres in the country that resulted in the gravest setbacks and destruction to the Party and the revolutionary movement, first in one major island and subsequently on a nationwide scale.

The document states that these erroneous policies "have caused setbacks through a process of self-constriction and have inflicted unprecedentedly heavy losses in the strength of the Party and the people's army and gross reductions of mass base".

The criticism and debates that ensued between the leading party cadres resulted in the expulsion of advocates of "left and right opportunism", notably forming the so-called "rejectionists" and "reaffirmist" factions.

The rejectionists took the lines of "strategic counteroffensive", "regularization", and combining military adventurism with insurrectionism from 1980 onward that overlapped with the reaffirmists who uphold the "correct" revolutionary method of people's war.

The rectification movement was aimed to defeat the "wrong line" in a comprehensive and thoroughgoing manner and strengthen the party ideologically, politically and organizationally. Thus, the rectification movement came into force in 1992, especially after the Plenum of the Central Committee approved the rectification documents.

Splits and divisions 

Not all CPP cadres abided by the "Reaffirm" document penned by Liwanag. Those who affirmed the Maoist orthodoxy were called the "Reaffirmists", or RA, while those who rejected the document were called "Rejectionists" or RJ. In July 1993, the Komiteng Rehiyon ng Manila-Rizal (KRMR), one of the Rejectionists, declared its autonomy from the central leadership:

Within a few months, several of the Party's regional formations and bureaus followed suit: Central Mindanao, Western Mindanao, Negros and Central Visayas, the Visayas Commission (VisCom) staff and New People's Army units under its control, the National Peasant Secretariat, the United Front Commission and the Home Bureau and Western Europe committee.

The KRMR, VisCom and the Central and Western Mindanao regional committees later merged to form the Rebolusyonaryong Partido ng Manggagawa – Pilipinas (RPM-P) in 1998. However, the Mindanao-based cadres later left the RPM-P after a debate regarding the RPM-P's signing of a peace pact with the government then led by Joseph Estrada. Those cadres then formed the Rebolusyonaryong Partido ng Manggagawa – Mindanao (RPM-M) which joined the Fourth International in 2003.

The KRMR faction led by Filemon Lagman was earlier expelled from the RPM-P due to his "liquidationist" attitude and refusal to help in Party preparations and functions. He then formed the Partido ng Manggagawang Pilipino (PMP), however his closest associates, led by Sonny Melencio, bolted to form the legal political party Sosyalistang Partido ng Paggawa (SPP) in 1998.

The United Front Commission cadres formed the Partido Proletaryo Demokratiko (PPD) which then merged with Lagman's PMP and Melencio's SPP to give rise to the Partido ng Manggagawang Pilipino-Pinagsanib (PMP-Pinagsanib). But in 2007 another reported split occurred due to the rift between Lagman and Melencio supporters.

In 1997 several cadres from the Central Luzon committee were accused of sowing factionalism and "civilianization" of the NPA units. These cadres earlier supported the "Reaffirm" document by CPP Chairman Armando Liwanag and tried appealing for the Chairman's support. This did not materialize though, and the cadres formed the Marxist–Leninist Party of the Philippines (MLPP) and organized the armed wing Rebolusyonaryong Hukbo ng Bayan (RHB). The MLPP-RHB maintains the national-democratic framework of social analysis by the CPP, although slightly modified. They also maintain the strategy of people's war, but are more akin to Vietnamese and Nepalese revolutionary strategies.

Designation as a terrorist organization
In December 2017, President Rodrigo Duterte issued a proclamation declaring the Communist Party of the Philippines (CPP) and its armed wing, the New People's Army (NPA), as terrorist organizations. The proclamation was made in accordance with the Human Security Act and the Terrorism Financing Prevention and Suppression Act. However, the CPP-NPA has not yet been legally declared as a terrorist group by Philippine courts.

Historically the CPP-NPA has been considered as an "organized conspiracy" by the Philippine government. The label was placed on the CPP's predecessor, the Partido Komunista ng Pilipinas-1930 and its armed group the Hukbalahap on 20 June 1957 through the Anti Subversion Act or Republic Act No. 1700. The law covered any succeeding organizations of the PKP-1930 and the Hukbalahap which includes the CPP-NPA. Being a member of groups covered by the law is considered illegal. In October 1992, Fidel Ramos signed a law repealing the Anti-Subversion law.

The United States and the European Union have designated the CPP–NPA as "foreign terrorist organizations" in 2002 and 2005, respectively.

Declarations of persona non grata against the CPP-NPA-NDF
On 11 December 2020, the Department of the Interior and Local Government said that 1,546 or 90.1% of the total 1,715 Local Government Units (LGUs) nationwide have declared the CPP-NPA-NDF persona non grata. Of these 1,546 LGUs, 64 are provinces, 110 are cities, 1,372 are municipalities, with the remaining 169 LGUs in various stages of deliberation in their respective provincial, city, and municipal councils. Some 12,474 barangays nationwide have also declared the CPP-NPA-NDF unwelcome in their territories. Six of the 17 regions in the country have reached a 100 percent declaration of persona non grata to the CPP-NPA-NDF, which are Central Luzon, Central Visayas, Zamboanga Peninsula, Mimaropa, and Cordillera Administrative Region.

The CPP-NPA responded by claiming that the declarations don't represent the will of the Filipino people, and accused the DILG and AFP of threatening the LGUs and local leaders with arrest and not giving their governments the funds they needed.

International relations 
It participates in the Maoist International Conference of Marxist–Leninist Parties and Organizations. It heads the broad revolutionary front organization, the National Democratic Front.

The People's Republic of China's (PRC) relations with the CPP have supposedly "been severed since the 1980s," although Chinese underground support systems to the rebellion have surfaced from time to time. The main line of Chinese supporters have officially cut ties with the party since 2000 as the economic use of the party to the Chinese were no longer needed as the party's members have been reduced significantly.

According to Stefan Engel in a 2015 interview, Main Coordinator of International Coordination of Revolutionary Parties and Organizations (ICOR), CPP is willing to join ICOR.

Ideology 
The Communist Party of the Philippines, which promotes Marxism–Leninism–Maoism (MLM), is a revolutionary proletarian party that looks upon the legacies of past Philippine rebellions and revolutions from the perspective of the theories of Karl Marx, Friedrich Engels, Vladimir Lenin, Joseph Stalin, and Mao Zedong. It assists the progress of theory and practice in the world proletarian revolution that is guided by Marxism–Leninism–Maoism (Preamble, Constitution of the Communist Party of the Philippines, 1968).

Amnesty proclamation

On 5 September 2007, President Gloria Macapagal Arroyo signed Amnesty Proclamation 1377 for members of the Communist Party of the Philippines and its armed wing, the New People's Army (NPA); other communist rebel groups; and their umbrella organization, the National Democratic Front. The amnesty will cover the crime of rebellion and all other crimes "in pursuit of political beliefs," but not including crimes against chastity, rape, torture, kidnapping for ransom, use and trafficking of illegal drugs and other crimes for personal ends and violations of international law or convention and protocols "even if alleged to have been committed in pursuit of political beliefs." The National Committee on Social Integration (NCSI) will issue a Certificate of Amnesty to qualified applicants. Implementing rules and regulations are being drafted and the decree will be submitted to the Senate of the Philippines and the House of Representatives of the Philippines for their concurrence. The proclamation becomes effective only after Congress has concurred.

Five-year plan
In 2022, the CPP leadership, in its 53rd-anniversary statement, boldly called for an advance in the revolutionary struggle and touted its forces to advance in the people's war for a new democracy. It declared its determination to strive within the next five years to make the great advance from the stage of strategic defense to the strategic stalemate, fulfilling all the requirements and without skipping any necessary phase.

It also predicted that a revolutionary government would not win the revolution by toppling the current Philippine government.

Referring to Maoist military doctrine, the CPP-lead NPA adheres to the three progressive phases of protracted warfare—strategic defensive, strategic stalemate, and strategic offensive (see Mobile warfare).

According to the CPP's calculations in the statement, they considered the present revolution to be at an advance sub-stage of strategic defensive.

Publications
 Ang Bayan (The People) – National publication of the Central Committee of the Communist Party of the Philippines
 Rebolusyon (Revolution) – Theoretical journal of the Central Committee of the Communist Party of the Philippines
 Balita ng Malayang Pilipinas (Free Philippines News Service) – News agency of the Communist Party and the National Democratic Front
 Liberation – Official publication of the National Democratic Front of the Philippines
 Ang Kalihukan (The Movement) – Publication of the National Democratic Front in Northern Mindanao
 Baringkuas (Uprising) – Revolutionary newspaper of the people of Cagayan Valley
 Kahilwayan (Liberation) – Official newspaper of the Kabataang Makabayan-Iloilo
 Kalatas (Message) – Official newspaper of the revolutionary people of Southern Tagalog
 Kalayaan (Freedom) – Official newspaper of the Kabataang Makabayan
 Daba-daba (Flame) – Revolutionary mass paper in Panay
 Dangadang (Struggle) – Revolutionary newspaper of the people of North-west Luzon
 Himagsik (Revolt) – Revolutionary newspaper of the people of Central Luzon
 Larab (Flame) – Revolutionary mass paper in Eastern Visayas
 Lingkawas (Liberation) – Publication of the Communist Party of the Philippines in Northeastern Mindanao
 Liyab (Flame) – Official Publication of KAGUMA
 Malayang Pilipina (Liberated Filipina) – Official Publication of MAKIBAKA
 Paghimakas (Struggle) – Newspaper of the Communist Party of the Philippines in the island of Negros
 Pakigbisog (Struggle) – Publication of the revolutionary people of Central Visayas
 Pasa Bilis (Courier) – Published by the National Democratic Front – Southern Mindanao
 Pilipinas (Philippines) – Revolutionary newspaper from the Christians for National Liberation (NDF member representing priests and religious personnel)
 Silyab (Spark) – Published by the Communist Party of the Philippines-New Peoples Army in Bicol
 Asdang (Advance) – Published by the National Democratic Front – Far South Mindanao

See also
Communist rebellion in the Philippines
Communist Party of India (Maoist)
 Communist Ghadar Party of India
 Shining Path

References

External links

Kilusan

Communist militant groups
Communist parties in the Philippines
International Conference of Marxist–Leninist Parties and Organizations (International Newsletter)
Maoism in the Philippines
Maoist parties
Anti-fascist organizations
Anti-capitalist organizations
National Democratic Front of the Philippines
Political parties established in 1968
Clandestine groups
Banned communist parties
Rebel groups in the Philippines
Communist terrorism
Organisations designated as terrorist by the European Union
Organizations designated as terrorist by the United States
Left-wing militant groups in the Philippines